The Daniel Sutherland House is located on Angola Road in Cornwall, New York, United States. It is the late-19th century  Stick-Eastlake style home of Sutherland, a grandson of David Sutherland, whose Colonial-era house is located further south on the road.

Sutherland, a local lawyer of prominence, bought several acres of his ancestral lands from the then-owners, the Chedeayne estate, around 1875. Eleven years later, he built the house in a vernacular interpretation of the then-popular Stick style. After his death the following year, his wife remarried, and around the turn of the century the building was used as a rooming house.

It has remained largely intact since its construction, with some more contemporary outbuildings. Much of the interior woodwork and furnishings are originals. It was added to the National Register of Historic Places in 1996.

References

Houses on the National Register of Historic Places in New York (state)
Houses completed in 1886
Cornwall, New York
Houses in Orange County, New York
National Register of Historic Places in Orange County, New York